Metacrias erichrysa is a species of moth of the family Erebidae. It is endemic to New Zealand. This species can be found in the lower half of the North Island and western alpine areas of the South Island. The adult female of the species is flightless and buff coloured whereas the male is brightly coloured and a rapid flier during daylight hours. The male of the species is on the wing from mid-November to early January. The species inhabits open herb and tussock fields in mountainous terrain at altitudes of between 900 and 1200 m. Larvae feed on Brachyglottis bellidioides, Festuca novae-zealandiae and indigenous species from the genera Acaena, Muehlenbeckia, Wahlenbergia and Raoulia.

Taxonomy

M. erichrysa was originally described by Edward Meyrick in 1886 from specimens collected on Mount Arthur as well as from subsequently reared larvae. George Hudson discussed and illustrated the species in his 1898 publication New Zealand moths and butterflies (Macro-lepidoptera) as well as in his 1928 book The Butterflies and Moths of New Zealand. The holotype specimen is held at the Natural History Museum, London.

Description
Adults males are brightly coloured and diurnal, while females are buff coloured and extremely short-winged.

Meyrick in his 1886 paper described the species as follows:

Distribution

This species is endemic to New Zealand, where it is known from the western alpine areas of the South Island and mountains of the lower half of the North Island.

Biology and behaviour
The females remain within their cocoon for mating and egg-laying. Once hatched the larvae first feed on her corpse. They then disperse widely. Larvae are present from mid summer until winter, when they commence larval diapause. The pupa is enclosed in a slight cocoon. Some larvae construct a 'nest' inside which they spin their cocoon. Cocoons are attached to any covering rock rather than to the ground or rocks below. It has been hypothesised that these behaviours are likely to protect the cocoon against melting snow.

The male adults of this species are on the wing in mid November to early January. They fly rapidly and are difficult to catch. Males are attracted to females by pheromones. Males of this species can be attracted to the scent of females of different species within their genus. Researchers have used females as lures to take advantage of this behaviour to detect males in new localities.

Habitat and host-plants

The adult moths prefer open herb and tussock fields in mountainous terrain at altitudes of between 900 and 1200 m. The larvae feed on Brachyglottis bellidioides as well as other grasses and herbs. Endemic plants that M. erichrysa larvae feed on include Festuca novae-zealandiae and indigenous species from the genera Acaena, Muehlenbeckia, Wahlenbergia and Raoulia.

References

External links

Photograph of 'nest' made by larvae of M. erichrysa.

Spilosomina
Moths of New Zealand
Endemic fauna of New Zealand
Moths described in 1886
Taxa named by Edward Meyrick
Endemic moths of New Zealand